Sudharmia is a genus of spiders in the family Liocranidae. It was first described in 2001 by Deeleman-Reinhold. , it contains three species, all found in Sumatra.

References

Liocranidae
Araneomorphae genera
Spiders of Indonesia